The Del Mar Debutante Stakes is an American thoroughbred horse race for two-year-old fillies run each year in early September at Del Mar Racetrack in Del Mar, California. A Grade I event since 1999, the Debutante is raced on dirt at a distance of seven furlongs and currently offers a purse of $300,000.

Inaugurated in 1951 at a distance of six furlongs, in 1974 the race was changed to a one-mile event then in 1993 to its current seven furlongs. From 2007 to 2014, it was run on a Polytrack all weather surface.

The Del Mar Debutante Stakes was raced in two divisions in 1984.

Records
Speed  record:
1:21.40 – Call Now (1994) (at current distance of 7 furlongs)

Most wins by a jockey:
 5 – Gary Stevens (1987, 1988, 1992, 2002, 2013) 
 5 – Bill Shoemaker (1953, 1954, 1972, 1974, 1979)

Most wins by a trainer:
 10 – Bob Baffert (1995, 1997, 1998, 1999, 2001, 2006, 2012, 2019, 2020, 2021)

Most wins by an owner:
 3 – Ellwood B. & Elizabeth E. Johnston (1959, 1970, 1971)

Winners since 1979

 In 1988, Approved to Fly finished first but was disqualified to second.
 In 1953, Frosty Dawn won the race but later was found to be ineligible and the race was awarded to Lady Cover Up.

References

 The 2008 Del Mar Debutante Stakes at Thoroughbred Times

Del Mar Racetrack
Horse races in California
Flat horse races for two-year-old fillies
Grade 1 stakes races in the United States
Graded stakes races in the United States
Recurring sporting events established in 1951
1951 establishments in California